The 1911 News of the World Match Play was the ninth News of the World Match Play tournament, played from 3 to 5 October 1911 at the Walton Heath Golf Club. 32 players competed in a straight knock-out competition, with each match contested over 18 holes, except for the final which was over 36 holes. The winner received £100 out of a total prize fund of £400. James Braid defeated Ted Ray by 1 hole in the final to win the tournament.

Qualification
Entry was restricted to members of the Professional Golfers' Association (PGA). Qualification was by a series of 36-hole stroke-play competitions; one for each of the eight PGA sections. The Southern section had 12 qualifiers, the Northern section 7, the Midland section 5, the Scottish, Welsh and Western sections 2 and the Eastern and Irish sections 1. Because of the large number of entries in the Southern section, two events were run with 6 qualifiers at each venue. Compared to 1910, the number of qualifiers from the Southern section was reduced by one with the Midland section increasing by one. In the event of a tie for places there was a playoff.

The qualifiers were:

Eastern section: Ernest Riseborough
Irish section: Charlie Pope
Midland section: James Adwick, Jack Bloxham, Len Holland, George Tuck, Tom Williamson
Northern section: Jack Gaudin, Walter Hambleton, Cyril Hughes, Bill Leaver, Ted Ray, Thomas Renouf, Sam Whiting
Southern section at Acton Golf Club: James Braid, George Duncan, Fred Leach, James Sherlock, Josh Taylor, Harry Vardon
Southern section at West Drayton Golf Club: Laurie Ayton, Snr, James Batley, Arthur Catlin, Sandy Herd, Charles Mayo, Fred Robson
Scottish section: Tom Fernie, Willie Watt
Western section: Ernest Firstbrook, Herbert Osborne
Welsh section: Syd Ball, Peter Rainford

Format
The format was unchanged. Matches were over 18 holes except for the final which was over 36 holes. Extra holes were played in the event of a tied match. Two rounds were played on the first day, two more on the second day with the final on the third day.

Results
Source:

w/o = Walk over

Prize money
Prize money was increased to £400. The winner still received £100 and a gold medal, but the runner-up now received £40 and a silver medal, losing semi-finalists £20 and a bronze medal, losing quarter-finalists £15, second round losers £10 and first round losers £5. The new distribution meant that all 32 qualifiers for the final stages received at least £5.

References

Golf tournaments in England
News of the World Match Play
News of the World Match Play
October 1911 sports events